Matias Spektor (born 1977) is Full Professor of International Relations and founder of the School of International Relations at FGV in São Paulo, Brazil. His current research focuses on climate change politics, political violence, and international security in the Global South. He is the author of a series of books on U.S. policy towards Brazil and Latin America, including Kissinger and Brazil (2009), 18 Days (2014), and The Origins of Nuclear Cooperation (2015). In the period 2012-19, he wrote a regular op-ed column on foreign policy and grand strategy for Folha de S. Paulo, Brazil's leading newspaper.

Career 
After receiving his BA from the University of Brasília in 1999, Spektor worked as program officer for the United Nations until 2002. Upon completing his doctorate from the University of Oxford in 2007, he became assistant professor at FGV in Rio de Janeiro, where he taught until 2015 and was founding director of the Center for International Relations. He was a visiting scholar with the Council on Foreign Relations (2010), the Woodrow Wilson International Center for Scholars (2012) and the London School of Economics (2014). In 2013-14, Spektor was the inaugural Rio Branco Chair at King's College London.

In 2015, Spektor moved to the FGV campus in São Paulo to plan, implement, and launch a School of International Relations, which opened doors to its first cohort of students in 2019. The School offers state-of-the-art training in international relations to some 400 undergraduate students, and plans to open a graduate program in 2023.

In 2022-23, Spektor is a visiting scholar with Princeton University and with the Carnegie Endowment for International Peace.

References

Academic staff of Fundação Getulio Vargas
International relations scholars
Argentine academics
Living people
Members of the Inter-American Dialogue
1977 births